KNJR-LP (107.9 FM) is a low-power FM radio station that is licensed to Moorpark, California, and serves the Moorpark area. Owned by Conejo Radio Ministries, As of May 13, 2021, KNJR posted this statement on their site "Dear Listeners,
As of today (May 13th) we are going off the air. Unfortunately our Christian Music format is not viable and we are not able to continue. Thank you for fourteen years of support for KNJR." The station has filed to go silent once again and once again KOXC-LP in Oxnard has extended coverage as a result of KNJR going silent.
As of November 28th KNJR returned to the air temporarily Simulcasting J1 HD which is heard in Malibu on KBUU HD3

History
The initial construction permit for KNJR-LP was issued to Calvary Community Church, a nondenominational Christian church in Westlake Village, California, by the Federal Communications Commission on November 19, 2004. On November 6, 2007, the church transferred the license to Conejo Radio Ministries, who started broadcasting soon after. On October 31, 2022, KNJR-LP filed with the FCC to move their tower site from Thousand Oaks to Moorpark; the station was licensed to serve Moorpark effective December 13, 2022.
On March 1, 2023, Conejo Radio Ministries filed to transfer KNJR License to Ventura County Community College District.

References

External links
 

Radio stations established in 2007
NJR-LP
2007 establishments in California